2 Shows Nightly is a 1968 live album by Peggy Lee.

At Lee's request, this album was abruptly withdrawn from circulation almost immediately after its release in 1968.

Track listing

2010 Reissue Bonus Tracks

13. "Make Believe" – (1964; previously unavailable on Peggy Lee solo CD)

14. "Stay with Me" – (1966 single; CD debut; previously unreleased stereo mix) 

15. "Happy Feet" – (1966 single; CD debut; previously unreleased stereo mix) 

16. "That Man" – (1966 single; previously unavailable on Peggy Lee solo CD; previously unreleased album mix) 

17. "I Feel It" – (1967 single) 

18. "The Lonesome Road" – (1967 single; CD debut; previously unreleased stereo mix) 

19. "I Wound It Up" – (1967; CD debut; previously unreleased) 

20. "Money" – (1968; CD debut; previously unreleased) 

21. "Misty Roses" – (1968 single) 

22. "It’ll Never Happen Again" – (1968 single) 

23. "Reason to Believe" – (1968 single; CD debut) 

24. "Didn’t Want to Have to Do It" – (1968 single)

References

External links
Peggy Lee Discography

1968 live albums
Peggy Lee live albums
Albums produced by Charles Koppelman
Capitol Records live albums